The 1976–77 Soviet Cup was the 18th edition of the Soviet Cup ice hockey tournament. CSKA Moscow won the cup for the 10th time in their history. The cup was divided into four groups, with the top team in each group advancing to the playoffs.

Group phase

Group 1

Group 2

Group 3

Group 4

Playoffs

Semifinals

Finale

References

External links 
 Tournament on hockeyarchives.info
 Tournament on hockeyarchives.ru

Cup
Soviet Cup (ice hockey) seasons